John Brown (c. 17921845) attended Queens' College, Cambridge. He was vicar of St. Mary's Leicester and famous for his evangelical preaching.

References 

1790s births
1845 deaths
Evangelists
Alumni of Queens' College, Cambridge
Year of birth uncertain